Peter Wright was an early professional football player. In 1893, he was under contract by the Allegheny Athletic Association to be paid $50 per game for the entire season. That season Peter, Ollie Rafferty and James Van Cleve were all under contract.

External links

Players of American football from Pennsylvania
Allegheny Athletic Association players
Year of birth missing
Year of death missing
19th-century players of American football